Aleksandr, Alexander or Alexandr Vlasov may refer to:

 Aleksandr Vlasov (figure skater) (born 1955), former Soviet pair skater and coach
 Aleksandr Vlasov (politician) (1932–2002), Soviet politician
 Aleksandr Vlasov (cyclist) (born 1996), Russian cyclist
 Aleksandr Vlasov (politician, born in 1902) (1902–1942), Soviet politician